Litšilo FC is a Mosotho football club based in Pitseng that currently competes in the Lesotho A–Division. The club was founded in 1980.

References

External links
Global Sports Archive profile

Football clubs in Lesotho
Lesotho A–Division clubs
Association football clubs established in 1980